Ripogonum scandens, (commonly known as supplejack, Māori: kareao, pirita, translated as "twisted rope") is a common rainforest vine native to New Zealand. It can also grow in areas of swamp.

Supplejack is a climbing liana, that has hard but flexible stems. It starts its life as a sappy stem searching for a support. Once it finds a shrub or tree to cling onto, it grows upwards to access sunlight, where it then develops branches and leaves.

The supplejack flowers from December to February. It however bears clusters of red berries throughout the year.

During summer supplejack tips grow 5 centimetres a day, enabling the plant to climb high up into the canopy of the forest.

Taxonomy
In 1769, during explorer Lieutenant James Cook's first voyage of discovery, botanists Joseph Banks and Daniel Solander collected specimens of "supplejack" (Ripogonum scandens) in New Zealand. The species was described in Solander's unpublished manuscript Primitiae Florae Novae Zelandiae and was illustrated by Sydney Parkinson.  Cook again visited New Zealand in 1773 during his second voyage. While anchored at Dusky Bay (now Dusky Sound) in the South Island of New Zealand, he remarked in his journal:

During this voyage naturalist Johann Reinhold Forster, assisted by his son Georg Forster collected plant specimens, the elder Forster offering the following description in his journal:

In 1776, the Forsters published the genus Ripogonum in the second edition of  their Characteres Generum Plantarum with Ripogonum  scandens as the type species.

Species description 
The Supplejack vine is an evergreen (a plant, bush or tree that retains it leaves for the duration of the year), indigenous climbing vine. It climbs by coiling its stems around tree trunks and branches. When there are no supporting trees for the vines to climb up, the vines create a tangled mess on the forest floor, creating a dense knotted entanglement. In the first few years of establishment, the SuppleJack mirrors a small shrub, but in its later seasons the stems start to spiral around the supporting trees. In summer, when the conditions are right, the tips of the vines can grow up to 5 centimetres per day, giving ample opportunity for the vines to climb high into the canopy, suffocating trees in the fight for light. When the vines/ stems reach the sunlight at the top of the canopy, they begin to produce green leafy stems opposed to the brown woody stems; which begin to produce flowers and fruit. Flowering takes place during October till May granted the stem is in full light at the top of the canopy. Fruiting takes place throughout the year  and the Supplejack will produce small (1 cm diameter) red berries. The leaves are opposite, ovate and shiny. Male and female flowers are separate, female flowers produce the larger berries.

Traditional Māori uses

Traditionally supplejack was used by Māori to bind and pull objects. For example, the vine was used to tie firewood together and for towing small canoes.

Medicinally the supplejack root was boiled to make a drink to help a variety of conditions including rheumatism, fever, disability, bowel problems and skin diseases. The soft, fresh shoots of the vine can also be eaten raw or cooked as a vegetable.

Geographic distribution and habitat

Natural global range 
New Zealand.

New Zealand range 
Found in the North and South islands of New Zealand as well as a few offshore islands including Stewart and Chatham Islands. R. scandens is mainly present is lowland and mountainous forests dominated by hardwood and podocarp throughout the North island. Ripogonum scandens is not found on the Three Kings Islands and on the Poor knights Islands. It occurs infrequently in the Hawke’s Bay only in old coastal forests. It is found at altitudes in the North Island of up to 900m in the Kapamahunga range. In the South Island of New Zealand Ripogonum scandens does not tend to seep into the forests, instead staying on the seaward facing ranges. Throughout Marlborough, Canterbury and Otago the occurrence of  R. scandens is found sparingly in relics of old forests and mainly found on peninsulas such as Kaikoura, Banks and Otago. The supplejack vine is abundant on the western coast of the South Island.

Habitat preferences 
Ripogonum scandens will inhabit a wide range of soil types such as red-brown loams, pumice, yellow brown and alluvial. It has also been known to be able to withstand swampy forests where the soil may be flooded periodically throughout the year and hooping of the roots above ground was observed in such soil conditions. Due to the climbing nature to the Supplejack they require strong branches and trucks to be able to climb up or else they remain a matted shrub on the forest floor.

Phenology 
Shoots of differing lengths can be seen at all times during the year however they are most common during the springtime where the sun becomes stronger and they are able to photosynthesize more. Anthers become visible in December and through January. Once the anthers have been pollinated by either an insect or by wild pollination (wind dispersal/ browsing/ seed dispersal), the fruit takes approximately 12–15 months to fully ripen; the berries can be seen all year round. The seed germinates easily only if it doesn’t dry out.

Pathogens / predators 
Kererū (Hemiphaga novae-seelandiae) and blackbirds (Turdus merula) are two bird species that consume supplejack fruit. Kaka (Nestor meridionalis) have also been known to eat supplejack berries. A new climber species Geitonoplesium cymosum has been introduced to New Zealand. This species is similar to the native supplejack but may out-compete supplejack. Wild pigs also have a negative impact on juvenile supplejack as they forage through the forest floor. While they are disturbing and consuming other plants, they are also uprooting growing supplejack. Deer and cattle also have the same negative impact on supplejack. These mammals graze on the seedlings and growing juvenile plants. Possums(Trichosurus vulpecula) also feed on supplejack berries.
Sooty mould (Trichopeltheca asiatica). This fungus is common across New Zealand and smothers the supplejack leaves and stems, affecting the plant's photosynthetic capability.
Ctenopseustis obliquana larvae are found in ripe fruit and will consume the stems, leaves and flowers of the supplejack.

References

scandens
Flora of New Zealand